Porth Wen Brickworks first built by Charles E Tidy, is now a disused Victorian brickworks which produced fire bricks, made from quartzite (silica) used to line steel-making furnaces. The substantial remains include a number of buildings and the remains of some of the machinery, but has some damage from sea erosion. The site is a scheduled monument.

Location

The brickworks was established because of the readily available quartzite from the nearby quarries, a major component of fire bricks.

As with much of coastline of Anglesey, the brickworks lies within the area of the Anglesey Area of Outstanding Natural Beauty.

Description

Porthwen Brickworks includes quarries, an incline tramroad to the works, and includes a crushing house, moulding shed, drying sheds, and kilns. The brickmaking operation was supported by storage hoppers, engine house, boiler house, chimneys, warehouse and a quay.

Brickmaking started on the site in the mid 19th century, with the tramroad being added later, and the existing buildings being built in the early 20th century. Although the brickworks ceased production in the first half of the 20th century (sources vary on the date; either 1924 or 1949), the buildings and much of the equipment remain in situ, and the site shows:

Quarries and incline

The brickworks were supplied from two quarries to the north-west of the works. A tramroad from one of the quarries leading to a winding house and incline was shown on the 1st edition OS map, 1889.

The winding house includes two lateral walls of mortared walls of rubble masonry supporting a square drive shaft and bearings. The drive shaft supported three wheels each with eight spokes. The larger wheel was a banding-break and the other two were driving wheels for lowering and raising trucks on the incline. A wooden beam with a control mechanism remains in front the drive shaft. A second similar wooden beam lies nearby but is no longer in position.

The incline was gravity powered.

Brickmaking

The incline terminated at a crushing house where pieces of quartzite were broken up with a knapping machine. The pieces were passed down chutes to lower levels for further processing, resulting in a fine powder at the lowest stage. It is likely that the pieces of quartzite were reduced by hammer with the workers wearing iron covered gloves.

The resulting powder was mixed with lime and water in a pan mill. The resulting paste was then moulded and pressed into bricks in the moulding shed, and then dried out in drying sheds. Originally bricks were made using moulding and wire cutting, but were later made using a press.

After drying, the bricks were then fired in one of the three circular down-draught kilns (also known as beehive or Newcastle kilns), made of brick with iron bands and domed roofs.

The brickworks also includes the remains of a boiler house, which contained a Five-drum Stirling boiler, and a small engine house for a steam engine.

Storage and distribution

After firing, the bricks were stored in the main building, an impressive two-storey brick building, with gabled ends.

Bricks were then loaded onto ships, using a crane, moored at the loading quay.

History

Porth Wen brickworks was designated as a scheduled monument by Cadw in 1986 and classified as a post-medieval industrial brickworks.

See also

List of Scheduled Monuments in Anglesey

References

Further reading

External links
 – map of part of Anglesey Area of Outstanding Natural Beauty
 – includes Maps 13 to 28 covering the coast of Anglesey
 – extensive gallery of photos from July 2015

Scheduled monuments in Anglesey
Llanbadrig
Brickworks in the United Kingdom
Industrial buildings in Wales
Industrial archaeological sites in Wales